The Chile national cricket team is the team that represents Chile in international cricket. The team is organised by the Chilean Cricket Association, which became an affiliate member of the International Cricket Council (ICC) in 2001 and an associate member in 2017. However, the national side had debuted as early as 1893, when it played Argentina in Santiago. Chile began playing regular international matches in the early 1920s, and, with the exception of a gap during World War II, has continued to do so since then. Until the team affiliated to the ICC, its opponents were almost all other South American teams. It first participated in an ICC tournament in 2006, when it fielded a team in division three of the 2006 ICC Americas Championship. In the South American Championships, which began in 1995, Chile has participated in every edition, but won only twice, in 2011 & 2016.

History
Cricket was first played in the country in 1829 and the first club, the Valparaíso Cricket Club was formed in 1860. Their first international fixture was played in 1893 against Argentina.  Chile provided two players to the South American combined cricket team which toured England in 1932 (playing several first-class matches) – Alfred Jackson and Charles Sutton.

Interest in the game had waned after the Second World War, although a national side continued to play regular matches, and Chile did not become a member of the International Cricket Council until 2002. .

Their first ICC tournament was the Division Three tournament of the ICC Americas Championship, played in Suriname in February 2006. The Chileans finished in third place, their only win coming against Brazil.

The February 2008 edition of the Division 3 tournament was held in Argentina. Chile defeated Belize, Turks & Caicos Islands and Peru only to lose to Brazil. Chile finished the tournament second due to net run rate.

Chile has participated in every edition of the South American Championship since it was first held in 1995, and hosted it twice. It won the tournament in 2016 and 2011, and has been runner-up on six other occasions.

In April 2018, the ICC decided to grant full Twenty20 International (T20I) status to all its members. Therefore, all Twenty20 matches played between Chile and other ICC members after 1 January 2019 will be a full T20I.

Chile played their first T20I match against Brazil on 3 October 2019 during the 2019 South American Cricket Championship in Peru

Tournament history

ICC Americas Championship
 2006: 3rd place (Division Three)
 2008: 2nd place
 2009: 3rd place

South American Championship
 1995: 2nd place
 1997: 4th place
 1999: 3rd place
 2000: 2nd place
 2002: 2nd place
 2004: 4th place
 2007: 3rd place
 2009: 2nd place
 2011: 1st place
 2013: 2nd place
 2014: 2nd place
 2015: 3rd place
 2016: 1st place
 2017: 2nd place
 2018: 8th place
 2019: 7th place

Records

International Match Summary — Chile
 
Last updated 5 October 2019

Twenty20 International 
 Highest team total: 104/6 (17.3 overs) v. Mexico on 4 October 2019 at El Cortijo Polo Club, Lima.
 Highest individual score: 32, Major Mandy  v. Peru on 5 October 2019 at El Cortijo Polo Club, Lima.
 Best individual bowling figures: 4/21, Hirenkumar Patel v. Mexico on 4 October 2019 at El Cortijo Polo Club, Lima.

Most T20I runs for Chile

Most T20I wickets for Chile

T20I record versus other nations

Records complete to T20I #915. Last updated 5 October 2019.

Other matches
For a list of selected international matches played by Chile, see Cricket Archive.

See also
List of Chile Twenty20 International cricketers

References

External links
 Official Site

Cricket in Chile
National cricket teams
Cricket
Chile in international cricket